The 2016 wildfire season involved wildfires in multiple continents.

List of wildfires

Asia
2016 Uttarakhand forest fires, India
November 2016 Israel fires, Israel

Europe
2016 Portugal wildfires, Portugal

North America
2016 California wildfires, United States 
2016 Fort McMurray wildfire, Canada
Baker Canyon Fire, United States
Strawberry Fire (2016), United States
Hayden Pass Fire, United States
2016 Washington wildfires, United States
2016 Great Smoky Mountains wildfires, United States
2016 Southeastern United States wildfires, United States
Anderson Creek Fire, United States

Oceania
2016 Tasmanian bushfires, Australia
2015–16 Australian bushfire season, Australia
2016–17 Australian bushfire season, Australia

References

External links

NWCC 2016 annual fire report

2016 wildfires
2016